Robert Thomas John Galbally  (18 January 1921 – 14 April 2004) was a doctor and Australian rules footballer.

He attended St Patrick's College and studied medicine at the University of Melbourne. He graduated in 1944. He first worked at Melbourne's St Vincent's Hospital then for a few months in general practice with his brother-in-law at Coburg before moving to a practice at Hartwell. After 30 years, he moved the practice to East Camberwell until he retired in 2000.

Football
Galbally played 8 games with the Collingwood in 1944 in the Victorian Football League (VFL). He ended the season as tied leading goalkicker, having scored 26, the same as Lou Richards.

Family
Galbally was the seventh of nine children of William and Eileen Galbally. Two of his brothers, Jack Galbally MLC and Frank Galbally, also played for Collingwood and were criminal lawyers. Sister Kathleen Galbally was an anaesthetist and brother Bryan Galbally a specialist in intensive care. He married Joan Collins in 1945 and they had nine children.

Notes

External links 

		
Profile on Collingwood Forever

1921 births
2004 deaths
Australian rules footballers from Melbourne
Collingwood Football Club players
University Blacks Football Club players
Fellows of the Royal Australasian College of Physicians
People from Murrumbeena, Victoria
University of Melbourne alumni sportspeople
Medical doctors from Melbourne